Alfonso José Rippa Castro is a former Mexican defensive footballer. He last played for Club Atlético Zacatepec of the Ascenso MX. His debut was with Club América second division team. In January 2008, he signed with BK Häcken of the Sweden league.

External links 

 Ficha

1986 births
Living people
Footballers from Mexico City
Mexican people of Italian descent
Mexican expatriate footballers
Mexican footballers
Expatriate footballers in Sweden
BK Häcken players
Querétaro F.C. footballers
Association football defenders